Samara Airlines was an airline based in Samara, Russia. It operated scheduled and charter flights from Samara to destinations in Russia and other countries (mainly within the CIS) and charter flights to Austria, Cyprus, Greece, Israel, Spain, Turkey and United Arab Emirates. Its main base was at Kurumoch International Airport (KUF).

Samara Airlines was a member of the Russian AiRUnion alliance.

History 
The Kuybyshev Aviation Enterprise was established in 1961 and on this basis 65 Squadron was formed and later transformed into Kuybyshev Joint Aviation Squadron (KuAO), Kuybyshev being the Soviet name of Samara. The privatisation of KuAO in 1993 resulted in the establishment of the Joint Stock Company Samara Airlines. It is owned by the State Property Committee (51%) and private and corporate holdings (49%). The airline used the call-sign "beryoza" (birch tree).

It had suspended operations at the end of September 2008 due to the AiRUnion collapse.

Services 
As of September 2005, Samara Airlines operated the following services:

Domestic scheduled destinations: Anapa, Arkhangelsk, Irkutsk, Kazan, Krasnodar, Krasnoyarsk, Mineralnye Vody, Moscow, Nadym, Nizhnevartovsk, Novosibirsk, Novy Urengoy, Noyabrsk, Samara, Sochi, Saint Petersburg and Ufa.
International scheduled services: Almaty, Baku, Bukhara, Dushanbe, Gyumri, Khujand, Kyiv, Nakhichevan, Shymkent, Simferopol, Tashkent, Thessaloniki, Tianjin and Yerevan.

Fleet 

The Samara Airlines fleet included the following aircraft (as of May 2008):

References

External links 

Samara Airlines Fleet

Defunct airlines of Russia
Former Aeroflot divisions
Companies based in Samara, Russia
Airlines disestablished in 2008
Airlines established in 1961